Sven Harald Lückner (born March 27, 1957) is a Swedish retired professional ice hockey player and  head coach.

During his career he played for Färjestads BK between 1974 and 1988. During that period he won three Swedish Championships.

He was drafted in the seventh round by the New York Islanders at the 1977 NHL amateur draft as 121st pick overall. The same year he also got selected as 66th overall by the Houston Aeros in the eight round of the 1977 WHA Amateur Draft.

Since the Islanders did not offer him a contract within one year, he became the first player to be drafted by a team in the NHL twice. This time the Vancouver Canucks selected Lückner in the fourth round, 56th overall, of the 1978 NHL Amateur Draft. However, he never played for any of the three teams.

Having played for Färjestad almost his entire career, he finished his playing career with one season as a player-coach for the Norwegian club Sparta Warriors in 1988–89.

After his retirement he has been a coach for several teams in the Elitserien, including Färjestads BK, HV71, Mora IK, Modo Hockey and Linköpings HC. During the 2006–2007 season, he won the Swedish National Championship with Modo Hockey.

References

Harald Lückner. Sports Reference. Retrieved 13 April 2020.

External links

Harald Lückner's 1977 NHL draft entry at HockeyDraftCentral.com
Harald Lückner's 1978 NHL draft entry at HockeyDraftCentral.com

1957 births
Living people
Färjestad BK players
Houston Aeros draft picks
Ice hockey players at the 1980 Winter Olympics
New York Islanders draft picks
Olympic bronze medalists for Sweden
Olympic ice hockey players of Sweden
Olympic medalists in ice hockey
Medalists at the 1980 Winter Olympics
People from Mariestad Municipality
Swedish ice hockey coaches
Swedish ice hockey left wingers
Vancouver Canucks draft picks
Sportspeople from Västra Götaland County